The 2012 World Rally Championship was the 40th season of the FIA World Rally Championship. The season consisted of thirteen rallies, beginning with Monte Carlo Rally on 17 January, and ending on 11 November with Rally Catalunya.

Sébastien Loeb won the drivers' championship for the ninth time in his career, ahead of Finns Mikko Hirvonen and Jari-Matti Latvala. Citroën won the manufacturers' championship.

Calendar

The 2012 championship was contested over thirteen rounds in Europe, North America, South America and Oceania.

The 2012 calendar was announced at a meeting of the FIA World Motor Sport Council in Singapore on 26 September 2011.

Calendar changes
The rally also featured the longest stage of the championship, the  El Durzano–Ambul stage. The extended rally route has been promoted as a prototype of a format proposed by FIA President Jean Todt.
 The Jordan Rally was removed from the calendar. Rally Abu Dhabi was expected to be promoted in its place, but was omitted from the final calendar and given candidate status for future inclusion in the championship.
 The Wales Rally GB was brought forward from its traditional November date to September, making Rally of Spain the season finale.
 The route of the Rally Finland was revised from the 2011 event, and included the return of several famous stages, including Ouninpohja, Mokkipera and Palsankyla.
 The Rally Italia Sardegna was moved back from May to October.
 The Rallye Automobile Monte Carlo returned to the calendar after a three-year absence.
 The Rally New Zealand replaced Rally Australia, in keeping with their event-sharing arrangement.

Teams and drivers

World Rally Championship entries

Notes:
  – The Mini WRC Team lost Mini's support as a manufacturer team after the Monte Carlo Rally, making them ineligible to score points in the World Rally Championship for Manufacturers. The Mini WRC Team became known as the Prodrive WRC Team from the Rally de Portugal.
  – The Armindo Araújo World Rally Team and Palmeirinha Rally were merged to form WRC Team Mini Portugal with the support of Mini for the Rally of Sweden; however, the FIA ruled that they were not eligible to score points in the FIA World Rally Championship for Manufacturers.

Team and driver changes

 Chris Atkinson returned to the WRC to contest the Rally of Mexico with the Monster World Rally Team. He also drove at the Rally of Finland on behalf of the Qatar World Rally Team as Nasser Al-Attiyah was competing at the London Olympic Games, and later joined WRC Team Mini Portugal in the place of Armindo Araújo for the Rally of Germany. Atkinson's last appearance at the WRC level was a one-off drive with the Citroën Junior Team at the 2009 Rally Ireland.
 Ken Block will contest a reduced WRC program, appearing at Rally Mexico, Rally New Zealand and Rally Finland.
 The Citroën World Rally Team will expand to a three-car operation, entering a third Citroën DS3 WRC for 2011 Dakar Rally winner Nasser Al-Attiyah. Al-Attiyah was originally scheduled to contest every event with the exception of the Rallye Monte Carlo owing to a date clash with the 2012 Dakar Rally. However, Al-Attiyah was selected to represent his native Qatar at the London Olympics in skeet shooting and was forced to miss the Rally of New Zealand and the Rally of Finland.
 François Delecour returned to the WRC to compete in the 80ème Rallye Automobile de Monte-Carlo. Delecour drove a Ford Fiesta RS WRC in the rally, his first event at the WRC level since the 2002 Rally of Great Britain.  The Rallye Monte Carlo is Delecour's only planned appearance in the 2012 season.
 2011 championship runner-up Mikko Hirvonen and co-driver Jarmo Lehtinen moved from the Ford World Rally Team to Citroën.
 Jari-Matti Latvala was injured in an accident during a training exercise two weeks before Rally Argentina, forcing him out of the event. He was replaced by Dani Sordo for the event.
 Lotus Cars planned to enter a Lotus Exige R-GT at all tarmac events on the 2012 calendar, pending the homologation of the car. The Lotus Exige R-GT was Lotus' first entry in the World Rally Championship since the Talbot Sunbeam Lotus in 1983 Rally of Portugal, but the team later changed their plans and the team made its debut appearance at the Rali Vinho da Madeira, a round of the European Rally Championship instead of the WRC.
 Mini WRC Team will only enter one works driver in selected events of 2012, after the team was unable to find the budget for two full-time entries. Dani Sordo will enter in every event, with the second car driven by local competitors. The team has stated that Kris Meeke will not compete in every rally, but will remain a part of the team. On 6 February 2012, it was announced that the status of the Prodrive-operated team had been demoted to a works-supported private team, while the Motorsport Italia-run WRC Team Mini Portugal became the factory team of Mini. The team was renamed "Prodrive WRC Team" before the Rally de Portugal.
 Thierry Neuville, winner of the 2011 Tour de Corse in the Intercontinental Rally Challenge, will compete in nine rallies at the WRC level – with a provision for two more – in a Citroën DS3 WRC prepared by Citroën Racing Technology and run by PH Sport, which was re-opened after being closed down for the 2011 season. He also drove for the Qatar World Rally Team at the Rally of New Zealand. Neuville had previously contested the Junior World Rally Championship in with a Citroën C2 S1600 in 2010.
 Evgeny Novikov and Ott Tänak will join the M-Sport Ford World Rally Team.
 Sébastien Ogier was released from his three-year contract with Citroën after just one season. Ogier later joined Volkswagen to develop the Polo R WRC for their 2013 WRC entry, while contesting the full 2012 WRC schedule in a Škoda Fabia S2000 with regular co-driver Julien Ingrassia.
 Martin Prokop, who previously competed in the Super 2000 World Rally Championship, will take part in ten rallies driving a Ford Fiesta RS WRC.
 Kimi Räikkönen returned to Formula One. The WRC arm of his Ice 1 Racing team was subsequently shut down.
 Former M-Sport drivers Henning Solberg and Matthew Wilson joined the newly formed non-manufacturer Go Fast Energy World Rally Team with the intention of completing the season, but the team only appeared at the Rally Monte Carlo and the Rally of Sweden. Wilson later re-joined M-Sport for a one-off appearance at the Wales Rally GB.
 2003 World Champion Petter Solberg secured a seat with the Ford World Rally Team. His privately entered team, with which he had competed with between 2009 and 2011, was closed down.

SWRC entries

 Team and driver changes
 Bryan Bouffier, who won the 79ème Rallye Automobile de Monte-Carlo when it was a part of the Intercontinental Rally Challenge, will compete in 2012 Monte Carlo Rally with a Peugeot 207 S2000.
 Craig Breen, winner of the 2011 WRC Academy will enter the Super 2000 championship driving a Ford Fiesta S2000.
 Proton will enter the Super 2000 category for the first time, entering two Proton Satria Neos into the Rallye Monte Carlo for Per-Gunnar Andersson and Giandomenico Basso, with Alister McRae making an appearance later in the season. The team will compete at seven selected events in the 2012 season.
 Hayden Paddon, the 2011 Group N World Champion, will contest the Super 2000 championship, driving a Škoda Fabia S2000 prepared by Spanish team ASM Motorsport.

PWRC entries

WRC Academy entries
The WRC Academy uses identical Ford Fiesta R2s.

Results and standings

Results and statistics

Notes
† – Event was shortened after stages were cancelled.

Standings

Drivers' championship
Points are awarded to the top 10 classified finishers.

 Sébastien Loeb secured the drivers' championship title in France.

Notes:
1 2 3 refers to the classification of the drivers on the 'Power Stage', where bonus points are awarded 3–2–1 for the fastest three drivers on the stage.

Co-drivers' championship

Manufacturers' championship

 Citroën secured the manufacturers' championship in France.

Notes:
† — The Mini WRC Team lost its manufacturer status in February when parent company BMW withdrew works support from the team, demoting them to customer team status. The team kept the points it scored on Rallye Monte Carlo although it was no longer classified as a manufacturer entrant. They were replaced by the WRC Team Mini Portugal as the official Mini works team.
‡ – Armindo Araújo World Rally Team and Palmeirinha Rally merged to form WRC Team Mini Portugal. The points they scored at the Rallye Monte Carlo were removed from the manufacturers' championship.

SWRC Drivers' championship

Co-drivers

PWRC Drivers' championship

Co-drivers

WRC Academy Drivers' championship

Notes:
 1 refers to the number of stages won, where a bonus point is awarded per stage win.

Co-drivers

Changes
 In November 2011, Europol issued an arrest warrant for Russian banker Vladimir Antonov at the request of Lithuanian prosecutors as part of an investigation into asset-stripping at Antonov's commercial banks, Snoras and Latvijas Krājbanka. Antonov, who held the commercial rights to the sport through Convers Sports Initiatives, was arrested in London two days later and charged with fraud and embezzlement. Convers Sports Initiatives initially claimed to be unaffected by the arrest, but went into receivership at the end of the month. Promoter North One Sport issued a statement clarifying the situation, confirming that they were unaffected by Antonov's arrest and parent company Convers Sports Initiatives entering into receivership and that they would co-operate with the investigation into Bank Snoras. However, North One Sport were subsequently forced to find new investors, with bids from Qatar and French broadcaster Eurosport. It was later reported that negotiations with the Qatari bidders had collapsed, forcing the closure of North One Sport.
 The FIA World Motor Sport Council permitted tyre suppliers to provide teams and drivers with a second tyre compound, following several complaints from drivers about a lack of grip at the 2011 Rally Australia.
 On gravel rallies, shakedown stage will be used as a qualifying stage for P1 and P2 drivers. According to the results of qualifying, P1 and P2 crews – in order of fastest to slowest – will then select their start positions for the first day of the rally. On day two and three, P1 and P2 drivers will restart in reverse order according to their provisional overall classification. On asphalt rallies, regulations in previous years still apply.
 Organisers of WRC events will be allowed to specify whether cars failed to complete a section are permitted to restart the event on the next day. Restart after retirement, formerly known as SupeRally, will now be called "Rally 2".

References

External links

Official website of the World Rally Championship
 FIA World Rally Championship 2012 at ewrc-results.com

World Rally Championship seasons
World Rally Championship